The 2017 Louisville Cardinals men's soccer team represents University of Louisville during the 2017 NCAA Division I men's soccer season.  The Cardinals are led by head coach Ken Lolla, in his twelfth season.  They play home games at Lynn Stadium.  This is the team's 39th season playing organized men's college soccer and their 4th playing in the Atlantic Coast Conference.

Roster

Updated August 7, 2017

Coaching Staff

Source:

Schedule

Source:

|-
!colspan=8 style=""| Exhibition

|-
!colspan=7 style=""| Regular season

|-
!colspan=7 style=""| ACC Tournament

|-
!colspan=7 style=""| NCAA Tournament

Awards and honors

Rankings

MLS Draft 
The following members of the 2017 Louisville Cardinals men's soccer team were selected in the 2018 MLS SuperDraft.

References

Louisville
Louisville Cardinals men's soccer seasons
Louisville men's soccer
Louisville
Louisville